The Kirov class, Soviet designation Project 1144 Orlan (sea eagle), is a class of nuclear-powered guided-missile cruisers of the Soviet Navy and Russian Navy, the largest and heaviest surface combatant warships (i.e. not an aircraft carrier or amphibious assault ship) in operation in the world. Among modern warships, they are second in size only to large aircraft carriers, and of similar size to a World War I-era battleship. The ships are often referred to as battlecruisers by Western defence commentators due to their size and general appearance. The Soviet classification of the ship-type is "heavy nuclear-powered guided-missile cruiser".

The appearance of the Kirov class played a key role in the recommissioning of the s by the United States Navy in the 1980s.

The Kirov class hull design was also used for the Soviet nuclear-powered command and control ship SSV-33 Ural.

History
Originally built for the Soviet Navy, the class is named after the first of a series of four ships constructed, named Kirov until 1992. Original plans called for construction of five ships. The fifth vessel was planned to be named Fleet Admiral of the Soviet Union Kuznetsov, also referred as Dzerzhinsky. The name was later changed to Oktyabrskaya Revolutsiya (October Revolution), and then just Kuznetsov; but on 4 October 1990, plans for construction of a fifth vessel were abandoned.

The lead ship of the class, was laid down in June 1973 at Leningrad's Baltiysky Naval Shipyard, launched on 27 December 1977 and commissioned on 30 December 1980. When she appeared for the first time in 1981, NATO observers called her BALCOM I (Baltic Combatant I). Kirov suffered a reactor accident in 1990 during her second deployment, which was in the Mediterranean Sea. Repairs were never carried out due to lack of funds and the changing political situation in the Soviet Union, and she was placed in reserve where she was renamed Admiral Ushakov in 1992. She is presently laid up and was slated to be scrapped in 2021.

, the second vessel in the class, was commissioned in 1984. She was assigned to the Pacific Fleet. In 1992, she was renamed Admiral Lazarev. The ship became inactive in 1994 and was decommissioned four years later. On 21 February 2021, the Russian Armed Forces and the Russian State Atomic Energy Corporation Rosatom, signed a contract to dismantle and scrap the nuclear powered heavy cruiser. Admiral Lazarev set sail 30 April 2021 for 30th Shipyard. Dismantlement should be completed by 30 November 2025.

, now Admiral Nakhimov, was the third ship to enter service, in 1988. She was also assigned to the Northern Fleet. Renamed Admiral Nakhimov in 1992, she was mothballed in 1999 and reactivated in 2005. She is undergoing overhaul and modernization at Severodvinsk Shipyard.

Construction of the fourth ship, Yuriy Andropov, encountered many delays; her construction was started in 1986 but was not commissioned until 1998. She was renamed  (after Peter the Great) in 1992. She currently serves as the flagship of Russia's Northern Fleet.

In 1983, a command and control ship, SSV-33 Ural, was launched, although the ship would not be officially commissioned until 1989. She utilized the basic hull design of the Kirov-class vessels, but with a modified superstructure, different armament, and was intended for a different role within the Soviet Navy. Ural was decommissioned and laid up in 2001, due to high operating costs, and scrapped starting in 2010.

On 23 March 2004, English language press reported the Russian Navy Commander-in-Chief, Fleet Admiral Vladimir Kuroedov said Pyotr Velikys reactor was in an extremely bad condition and could explode "at any moment", a statement which may have been the result of internal politics within the Russian Navy. The ship was sent to port for a month, and the crew lost one-third of their pay.

As a consequence, both ships were earmarked for scrapping in 2021. The scrapping of Admiral Lazarev began in early 2021.

As of early 2022, only  was operational. Modernization of Admiral Nakhimov is ongoing and was reported, in 2021, to continue until "at least" 2023, with the modernization of Pyotr Velikiy to immediately follow and last for about three years. However, in early 2022, Sevmash CEO Mikhail Budnichenko stated that the ship would be delivered to the Russian Navy in 2022. The modernization of Admiral Nakhimov and her sister ship is to be extensive, with Admiral Nakhimov expected to receive 174 Vertical-launch (VLS) tubes: 80 for anti-surface and 94 for anti-air warfare, among other upgrades. In early 2022, the Sevmash CEO noted that weapons systems for Admiral Nakhimov would include: the Fort-M (NATO reporting name: SA-N-6 Grumble) and Pantsyr-M (SA-22 Greyhound) air defense systems and Paket-NK and Otvet antisubmarine warfare weapons. It was also reported that the cruiser would potentially be armed with up to 60 3M22 Zircon hypersonic anti-ship missiles.

Design
The class was originally conceived to counter the U.S. navy's submarines with its large payload of SS-N-14 anti-submarine missiles, and later evolved to carry twenty P-700 Granit anti-ship missiles for countering the U.S. carrier strike groups. Ultimately the class were intended to operate alongside new nuclear-powered aircraft carriers for global power projection, however these carriers never came to fruition.

Weapon systems

The Kirov class's main weapons are 20 P-700 Granit (SS-N-19 Shipwreck) missiles mounted in deck, designed to engage large surface targets. Air defense is provided by twelve octuple S-300F launchers with 96 missiles and a pair of Osa-MA batteries with 20 missiles each. Pyotr Velikiy carries some S-300FM missiles and is the only ship in the Russian Navy capable of ballistic missile defence. The ships had some differences in sensor and weapons suites: Kirov came with SS-N-14 anti-submarine warfare (ASW) missiles, while on subsequent ships these were replaced with 3K95 Kinzhal (Russian: Кинжал – dagger) surface-to-air missile (SAM) systems. The Kinzhal installation is in fact mounted further forward of the old SS-N-14 mounting, in the structure directly behind the blast shield for the bow mounted RBU ASW rocket launcher. Kirov and Frunze had eight  AK-630 close-in weapon systems, which were supplanted with the Kortik air-defence system on later ships.

Other weapons are the automatic  AK-130 gun system (except in Kirov which had two single  guns instead), 10  torpedo/missile tubes (capable of firing SS-N-15 ASW missiles on later ships) and Udav-1 with 40 anti-submarine rockets and two sextuple RBU-1000 launchers.

Russia is developing a new anti-ship missile to equip Kirovs called the 3M22 Tsirkon, which is capable of traveling at hypersonic speeds out to at least .

Armaments

Fire control

 2 × Top Dome for SA-N-6 fire control radar (the forward Top Dome is replaced with Tomb Stone (Passive electronically scanned array) in Pyotr Veliky)
 4 × Bass Tilt for AK-630 CIWS System fire control (not in Admiral Nakhimov or Pyotr Veliky)
 2 × Eye Bowl for SA-N-4 fire control (also for SS-N-14 in Admiral Ushakov)
 2 × Hot Flash/Hot Spot for SA-N-11 Grisom (CADS-N-1 units only)
 1 × Kite Screech for AK-100 or AK-130
 2 × Cross Sword for SA-N-9 (Gauntlet-equipped units only)

Ships

See also
List of naval ship classes in service
List of active Russian Navy ships
List of ships of Russia by project number
List of ships of the Soviet Navy

References

Sources

External links

 Illustrated article about the Kirov class
 Globalsecurity.org page on Kirov class
 Kirov class photos from Mark Meredith
 Encyclopedia of ships 
 Military Reform Support Fund  
 Forum discussion of ships' armament 
 FAS.org article 
 Project 1144 - Complete Ship List

Cruiser classes
Battlecruiser classes
 
 
 
Nuclear-powered ships
Nuclear ships of the Soviet Navy
Nuclear ships of the Russian Navy
Ship classes of the Russian Navy